Acacia scalpelliformis is a shrub of the genus Acacia and the subgenus Phyllodineae that is endemic to south western Australia.

Description
It resembles Acacia urophylla but has some subtle differences including trowel shaped phyllodes that have a distinctive gland angle along the barely scalloped or notched adaxial marginh. It blooms in September and produces yellow flowers.

Taxonomy
The species was first formally described by the botanist Carl Meissner in 1848 as part of the Johann Georg Christian Lehmann work Plantae Preissianae. It is not too far removed from the Acacia myrtifolia group.

Distribution
It is native to an area along the south coast in the South West and Great Southern regions of Western Australia between Augusta in the west and Denmark in the east where it is found in damp areas. It has a scattered distribution from around August in the south west to around Pemberton and Manjimup in the north to around Mount Chudalup in the east. It often occurs as scattered individuals among dense stands of Acacia urophylla.

See also
List of Acacia species

References

scalpelliformis
Acacias of Western Australia
Plants described in 1848
Taxa named by Carl Meissner